Prokshino is a Moscow Metro station on the Sokolnicheskaya line. It was opened on 20 June 2019, as part of an extension that included Kommunarka, Filatov Lug, and Olkhovaya.

It is in the Kommunarka area of Sosenskoye Settlement in the Novomoskovsky Administrative Okrug southwest of Moscow. It is an aboveground station along the Solntsevo-Butovo-Vidnoye Highway. The name Prokshino refers to a former village where the station is stand.

History
The city government decided to extend the line to Stolbovo in February 2016; an unexpected decision given that the city initially planned to extend the line only to Filatov Lug. The initial cost of the line was about 45 billion rubles. In July 2017, the city government confirmed that the extension would move forward, allowing construction to continue.

In March 2017, the city began clearing space around the planned station to accommodate the construction.

In 2022, the city plans to complete a tram line that connects the station to the town of Troitsk.

Design and Layout
The station has a single lobby with entrances on either side of the highway. Passengers is access the station via elevated walkways over the highway.

References

Sokolnicheskaya Line
Moscow Metro stations
Railway stations in Russia opened in 2019